Émile  Deyrolle (1838–1917) was a French naturalist and natural history dealer in Paris.
The business was originally owned by his naturalist grandfather, Jean-Baptiste Deyrolle who opened his shop in 1831 at 23, Rue de la Monnaie. Émile’s father Achille Deyrolle ran the business for many years. Émile took over in 1866. The  address from 1881 (and now) was (and is) 46, Rue du Bac, the former home of Jacques Samuel Bernhart. Deyrolle specialized in natural history publications and specimens taxidermy, minerals, rocks, fossils, botanical specimens, shells, taxidermy, microscopic specimens and microscopes.

References 

Jacques-Marie-Frangile Bigot 1868 Guide de l'amateur d'insectes : comprenant les généralités sur leur division en ordres, l'indication des utensiles et les meilleurs procédés pour leur faire la chasse, les époques et les conditions Société entomologique de France.Edition: 3e éd., rev., cor. et augm. Paris :chez Deyrolle Full text online here Addenda includes price lists of equipment and books supplied by Deyrolles et fils
Émile Deyrolle (c.1892) Oiseaux: avec 132 figures dans le texte et 27 planches en couleur. (Birds: with 132 figures and 27 plates in color) En Histoire Naturelle de la France. 3d Partie. Paris: par Deyrolle, É., Naturaliste Full text online here

External links 
Deyrolle Taxidermy shop in Paris
Deyrolles Flickr
BHL with Paul Groult Le Naturaliste journal des échanges et des nouvelles.Paris :Bureaux à Paris,1879–1910.
Mineral Record Labels

1838 births
1917 deaths
French naturalists
19th-century French botanists
French lepidopterists
Date of birth missing
Date of death missing
19th-century French zoologists
20th-century French zoologists
20th-century French botanists